Panpulmonata is a taxonomic clade of snails and slugs in the clade Heterobranchia within the clade Euthyneura.

Panpulmonata was established as a new taxon by Jörger et al. in October 2010.

The older name "Pulmonata" referred to a group of gastropods which were considered to be "air-breathers". This meaning certainly does not apply to the panpulmonate groups Acochlidia, Sacoglossa and Pyramidelloidea, and also was inaccurate when applied to some of the more traditional pulmonate taxa such as Siphonarioidea or Hygrophila, most members of which lack permanently air-filled lungs. However, the term Panpulmonata was chosen by Jörger et al. (2010) to provide some continuity in the terminology.
Panpulmonata consists of following taxa:

 Siphonarioidea
 Sacoglossa
 Glacidorboidea
 Amphiboloidea
 Pyramidelloidea
 Hygrophila
 Acochlidiacea (mentioned as Acochlidia)
 Eupulmonata: Stylommatophora, Systellommatophora, Ellobioidea, Otinoidea, Trimusculoidea.

Cladogram 
This cladogram shows phylogenic relations within the Heterobranchia, as proposed by Jörger et al. (2010):

See also 
 Changes in the taxonomy of gastropods since 2005#Heterobranchia
 Heterobranchia#2010 taxonomy
 Acochlidiacea#2010 taxonomy

References 
This article incorporates CC-BY-2.0 text from the reference.

External links